Amber Marshall (born June 2, 1988) is a Canadian actress, singer, and equestrian. She has appeared in several television films and series, most notably as Amy Fleming in the long-running CBC/Up TV series Heartland. For her performance in the series, Marshall won the inaugural Canada's Screen Star Award at the 1st Canadian Screen Awards.

Early life 
Marshall was born and raised in London, Ontario. A former veterinary assistant,  Marshall has been riding horses since she could walk and says that the two things she loves the most are "acting and horses". Marshall attended Lester B. Pearson School for the Arts, starting to act at the early age of 11; growing up, she went to the Original Kids Theatre Company.

Career 
Marshall made her acting debut in 2000 in a television series called Super Rupert. The following year, she starred in an episode of Twice in a Lifetime. She next performed in the television series Doc (2002) and Dark Oracle (2004), and in the television film  (2002).

In 2003, she was nominated for a Los Angeles-based Young Artist Award for Best Performance in a TV Movie, Miniseries or Special for Leading Young Actress for The Elizabeth Smart Story, a movie-of-the-week based on the true story of the 2002 kidnapping of Utah teenager Elizabeth Smart.

In 2007, Marshall was cast as Amy Fleming in the forthcoming CBC/Up TV series Heartland. The series is based on the 25-novel series written by Lauren Brooke. The series premiered on Canadian television in October 2007 and in originally in syndication in the US on The CW Plus group of stations affiliated with The CW network, and then in 2010, it moved to GMC (now Up TV) and its fifteenth season premiered on May 19, 2022 in the US on Up. The series, filmed in High River Alberta, is about a girl named Amy Fleming living in the fictional town of Hudson Alberta. Her family owns a horse ranch called Heartland, where they have a long tradition of healing horses.  For her performance in the series, Marshall won the inaugural Canada's Screen Star Award at the 1st annual Canadian Screen Awards. In 2015, Heartland surpassed Street Legal as the longest-running one-hour scripted drama in the history of Canadian television.

Personal life 
As of 2016, Marshall lives on a farm ranch outside Calgary, Alberta with her husband Shawn Turner and their animals. Marshall married Shawn, a photographer, on July 27, 2013, after becoming engaged in early 2012.

In between filming seasons of Heartland, Marshall helps out at a local veterinary clinic and spends time with her many animals on her farm ranch near Calgary, Alberta. She has horses, dogs, cats, chickens, rabbits and an alpaca. She has also volunteered at a Wildlife Rehabilitation Centre where she took raptor classes, to work with falcons and hawks.

Filmography

Awards and nominations

References

External links 
 
 
 Amber Marshall on the CBC website

1988 births
21st-century Canadian actresses
Actresses from London, Ontario
Canadian child actresses
Canadian film actresses
Canadian television actresses
Living people